The 2001 Giro d'Italia was the 84th edition of the Giro. It began with a  prologue that went from Montesilvano to Pescara. The race came to a close on June 10 with a mass-start stage that ended in the Italian city of Milan. Twenty teams entered the race that was won by the Italian Gilberto Simoni of the  team. Second and third were the Spanish riders Abraham Olano and Unai Osa.

In the race's other classifications,  rider Fredy González won the mountains classification, Massimo Strazzer of the  team won the intergiro classification and the points classification.  finished as the winners of the Trofeo Fast Team classification, ranking each of the twenty teams contesting the race by lowest cumulative time.

Teams

A total of 20 teams were invited to participate in the 2001 Giro d'Italia. Each team sent a squad of nine riders, so the Giro began with a peloton of 180 cyclists. Out of the 180 riders that started this edition of the Giro d'Italia, a total of 136 riders made it to the finish in Milan.

The 20 teams that took part in the race were:

Route and stages

The route for the 2001 Giro d'Italia was unveiled by race director Carmine Castellano and organizers RCS Sport on 11 November 2000 in Milan at the Verdi theatre. It contained two time trial events, both of which were individual. In the stages containing categorized climbs, four had summit finishes: stage 4, to Mercogliano; stage 13, to Passo Pordoi; and stage 18, to Santuario. The organizers chose to include one rest day. When compared to the previous year's race, the race was  shorter, contained the same amount of rest days, and one less individual time trial. In addition, this race had an opening prologue like the year before. It was the longest Grand Tour of the season.

The race will only leave Italy once during its twenty-two racing days as it enters Slovenia where the day finishes in Ljubljana. The lone rest day came after sixteen racing days, on 5 June.

A Cycling News writer felt there were two very tough stages in the race, stages 13 and stage 18. In particular the writer felt the two passes of the Passo Pordoi and the climbs of Passo Rolle and Passo Fedaia made stage 13 particularly difficult. The eighteenth stage contained the Cima Coppi Colle Fauniera which was an  climb with an average gradient of 9.5%. The previous year's winner Garzelli described the route to be a "hard Giro, but not the hardest." Pantani said it was an "uncertain Giro" and that the limited time trial distances and fewer climbing kilometers would help Jan Ullrich. Former winner Three-time winner Felice Gimondi agreed with Pantani regarding Ullrich and the route, stating that "it should make certain the presence of Ullrich." Cipollini commented that it's a "Giro with something for everyone."

Classification Leadership

In the 2001 Giro d'Italia, five different jerseys were awarded. For the general classification, calculated by adding each cyclist's finishing times on each stage, and allowing time bonuses for the first three finishers on mass-start stages, the leader received a pink jersey. This classification is considered the most important of the Giro d'Italia, and the winner is considered the winner of the Giro.

Additionally, there was a points classification, which awarded a mauve jersey. In the points classification, cyclists got points for finishing in the top 15 in a stage. The stage win awarded 25 points, second place awarded 20 points, third 16, fourth 14, fifth 12, sixth 10, and one point fewer per place down the line, to a single point for 15th. In addition, points could be won in intermediate sprints.

There was also a mountains classification, which awarded a green jersey. In the mountains classifications, points were won by reaching the top of a mountain before other cyclists. Each climb was categorized as either first, second, or third category, with more points available for the higher-categorized climbs. The highest point in the Giro (called the Cima Coppi), which in 2001 was the Colle Fauniera, afforded more points than the other first-category climbs.

The fourth jersey represented the intergiro classification, marked by a blue jersey. The calculation for the intergiro is similar to that of the general classification, in each stage there is a midway point that the riders pass through a point and where their time is stopped. As the race goes on, their times compiled and the person with the lowest time is the leader of the intergiro classification and wears the blue jersey.

There were also two classifications for teams. The first was the Trofeo Fast Team. In this classification, the times of the best three cyclists per team on each stage were added; the leading team was the team with the lowest total time. The Trofeo Super Team was a team points classification, with the top 20 placed riders on each stage earning points (20 for first place, 19 for second place and so on, down to a single point for 20th) for their team.

The rows in the following table correspond to the jerseys awarded after that stage was run.

Final standings

General classification

Points classification

Mountains classification

Intergiro classification

Trofeo Fast Team classification

Trofeo Super Team classification

Minor classifications

Other less well-known classifications, whose leaders did not receive a special jersey, were awarded during the Giro. Other awards included the Combativity classification, which was a compilation of points gained for position on crossing intermediate sprints, mountain passes and stage finishes. Italian Massimo Strazzer won the Most Combative classification. The Azzurri d'Italia classification was based on finishing order, but points were awarded only to the top three finishers in each stage. Mario Cipollini won the Azzurri d'Italia classification. Paolo Savoldelli won the combination classification.

Doping cases
During the Giro, test for EPO performed on Sergio Barbero in the 2001 Tour of Romandie came back positive. For this reason, Barbero did not start the twelfth stage, pending confirmation of his penalty.

Riccardo Forconi and Pascal Hervé tested positive for EPO, and were not allowed to start stage 17.
After stage 17, the Italian police held a doping raid in the cyclists' hotels. Doping was found in Dario Frigo's room, and he was removed from the race, and banned for 6 months.
Noan Lelarge tested positive for a banned steroid, and was consequently fired by his team .

References

Citations

 
2001 in Italian sport
2001 in road cycling
2001
May 2001 sports events in Europe
June 2001 sports events in Europe